Olavi Manninen (20 July 1928 – 15 February 2011) was a Finnish long-distance runner. He competed in the marathon at the 1960 Summer Olympics.

References

1928 births
2011 deaths
Athletes (track and field) at the 1960 Summer Olympics
Finnish male long-distance runners
Finnish male marathon runners
Olympic athletes of Finland
Sportspeople from Jyväskylä
20th-century Finnish people